San Pedro Partido is a partido located in the north of the Argentine province of Buenos Aires. Its capital city is San Pedro.

Economy

The economy of San Pedro Partido is dominated by farming, and the main agricultural products include wheat, soybean and fruit.

Other sources of revenue include factories, service industries and ecotourism.

Settlements

San Pedro
Santa Lucía
Gobernador Castro
Río Tala
La Buena Moza
Tablas
Pueblo Doyle 
Puerto Obligado.

Population

Population 2001 › 55,234
Population 1991 › 48,851 
Population 2010 › 59,036

References

External links

 
InfoGuide San Pedro (Spanish)
Tourist Information (Spanish)
Radiofonica 96.7 Local radio Station (Spanish)
La Radio 92.3 San Pedro Local radio Station (Spanish)

Partidos of Buenos Aires Province
States and territories established in 1784